Dehra (VidhanSabha or Assembly constituency & AC No.10) is one of the 68 assembly constituencies of Himachal Pradesh, a state in northern India. The town, municipality, and tehsil of Dehhra are part of this constituency. The assembly constituency is a part of the Hamirpur, Himachal Pradesh Lok Sabha constituency.

Members of Legislative Assembly

Election candidates

2022

Election results

2022

2017

See also
 Kangra district
 Hamirpur, Himachal Pradesh Lok Sabha constituency

References

External links
 

Kangra district
Assembly constituencies of Himachal Pradesh